Gilles Silvestrini (born 4 June 1961 in Givet) is a French composer of contemporary music and oboist.

Works 
Silvestrini received commissions for chamber music from numerous institutions such as the Festival de Flaine, the Théâtre du Châtelet, the Bibliothèque nationale de France, France Musique, etc. His Études (1997) were part of the works in the 2014 program of the entrance exam to the oboe class of the Conservatoire national supérieur de musique et de danse de Lyon.

References

External links 
 Etudes (6) for oboe on AllMusic
 Silvestrini on Classical Planet
 Gilles Silvestrini's Six Études pour Hautbois- Trevor Mowry, oboe (YouTube)

1961 births
Living people
People from Givet
Conservatoire de Paris alumni
École Normale de Musique de Paris alumni
20th-century French composers
21st-century French composers
French oboists
French male musicians
20th-century French male musicians
21st-century French male musicians